Ulisse Stacchini (July 3, 1871 – 1947) was an Italian architect. He was born in Florence and studied in Milan and died in Sanremo.

His major works include the Milan Central Station and Stadio Giuseppe Meazza.

External links 
 Page at artnet.com

1871 births
1947 deaths
Architects from Florence
19th-century Italian architects
20th-century Italian architects